River Station was a Southern Pacific Railroad passenger station location, southwest of the Los Angeles River and north of Downtown, in Los Angeles, California.  The site is within the present day Los Angeles State Historic Park.

History
The location for both stations was at the Southern Pacific's Los Angeles freight yard, at the north end of present-day Chinatown in Central Los Angeles. Their former site is in 'The Cornfield' section of Los Angeles State Historic Park.

First station (1876−1887)
The station was opened following the Southern Pacific's acquisition of the Los Angeles & San Pedro Railroad in 1873 and the railroad's construction of line linking San Francisco to Los Angeles. The first River Station was a wooden structure built in 1876. Transcontinental trains started serving the station in 1881. The two-story station had both women's and men's waiting rooms and later had a hotel and restaurants added to it. It was the arrival station of many migrants drawn during the land boom of the mid-1880s.

Second station (1887−1901)

The second River Station was built in 1887, on the site of the demolished original one. It was a brick Romanesque Revival style building.

Because the station was not in the city's center, Southern Pacific built the Arcade Depot in eastern Downtown Los Angeles in 1888. The second River Station was used until 1901, when it was demolished.

See also
"Not A Cornfield"
 Zanja Madre

References

Railway stations in Los Angeles
Chinatown, Los Angeles
Former Southern Pacific Railroad stations in California
Demolished buildings and structures in Los Angeles
Demolished railway stations in the United States
History of Los Angeles
19th century in Los Angeles

Railway stations in the United States opened in 1876
1876 establishments in California
1870s architecture in the United States
Victorian architecture in California

Railway stations in the United States opened in 1887
1887 establishments in California
1880s architecture in the United States
Romanesque Revival architecture in California
Railway stations closed in 1901
1901 disestablishments in California